Richard Muir may refer to:
Richard David Muir (1857–1924), British lawyer
Richard Ernest Muir (born 1943), British landscape archaeologist

See also
Dick Muir, South African rugby union player